The Juanito R. Remulla Sr. Road, formerly and still commonly referred to as Governor's Drive, is a two-to-nine lane,  network of primary, secondary and tertiary highways and bridges traversing through the central cities and municipalities of the province of Cavite, Philippines. It is the widest among the three major highways located in the province, the others being the Aguinaldo and Antero Soriano Highways.

The road forms part of National Route 65 (N65), National Route 651 (N651), National Route 403 (N403), and National Route 405 (N405) of the Philippine highway network.

History 

The origin of the highway could be traced back to three separate roads: Dasmariñas-Carmona-Biñang Road from Dasmariñas to Carmona, Naic-Quintana-Junction Dasmariñas-Silang from Naic to Dasmariñas, and an old provincial road linking the municipal centers of Naic, Maragondon, and Ternate. The first two were classified as secondary roads in the 1950s. The provincial road's segment from Naic to Maragondon was designated as Route 301, while its segment from Maragondon to Ternate was designated as Route 332. Additional sections were later added to form the present-day Governor's Drive.

By virtue of Republic Act No. 11047, enacted on June 29, 2018, the entire highway was renamed as Governor Juanito R. Remulla Sr. Road, after the former governor of Cavite.

Route description
The eastern terminus of the highway is at the Carmona Bridge at the Carmona–Biñan boundary. It traverses Carmona, General Mariano Alvarez, Silang, Dasmariñas, General Trias, Trece Martires, Tanza, Naic, Maragondon, and Ternate.

The highway is mostly concrete paved, while some other parts are currently being rehabilitated and being overlaid with asphalt.

Dasmariñas to Carmona

Governor's Drive towards the provincial boundary with Laguna starts near SM City Dasmariñas at the Pala-pala intersection with Aguinaldo Highway. It then winds eastward, as it nears Manila Memorial Park, just on the side of the highway. It intersects Paliparan Road and then enters General Mariano Alvarez through a bridge on the Dasmariñas–GMA boundary. It passes through GMA's town center and its boundary with Silang before curving northeast at the GMA–Carmona boundary. At Carmona, it mostly runs through the town's industrial areas and bypasses the town proper on the north as the segment that is officially known as Carmona Diversion Road. It soon crosses the South Luzon Expressway and enters Biñan, where it continues as General Malvar Street.

Dasmariñas to Ternate
Governor's Drive toward Ternate starts also at the intersection with Aguinaldo Highway at Pala-Pala, near Robinsons Place Dasmariñas. It is mostly a 6-lane highway when it runs westward towards General Trias. The highway passes through the western barangays of Dasmariñas, and then enters General Trias. It soon intersects Arnaldo Highway near the San Miguel and Purefoods-Hormel factories. The highway soon crosses Crisanto Mendoza de los Reyes Avenue at Manggahan. Then, it enters Trece Martires at Pulunan Bridge. Afterwards, it passes over Trece Martires city proper and continues toward Naic.

After passing Trece Martires, Governor's Drive continues westward on a slightly winding route toward Naic. It soon enters Naic, turns left toward Maragondon, where it turns away from the municipal proper. It enters Ternate, where it veers southwest towards the bridge carrying it over the Maragondon River. It then climbs the Mounts Palay-Palay–Mataas-na-Gulod Protected Landscape and ends at its intersection with Caylabne Road. The highway continues towards Nasugbu, Batangas as the Ternate–Nasugbu Road.

Intersections

Landmarks

The Governor's Drive is also home to many known places and landmarks. Such malls like SM City Dasmariñas, SM City Trece Martires, Robinsons Place Dasmariñas, Walter Mart General Trias, Walter Mart Trece Martires, and Walter Mart Carmona are located along the highway. Many industrial estates and factory plants are also located here such as the Golden Mile Business Park, People's Technology Complex, Mountview Industrial Complex, Grandville Industrial Complex, Dasmariñas Technopark, Monterey Meat Plant, the First Cavite Industrial Estate, Purefoods-Hormel Plant, Magnolia Plant, Sugarland Estates, Eagle Ridge Golf Course and the Royal Tern Ceramics Philippines.

Notes

References

External links

 

Roads in Cavite
Roads in Laguna (province)